Physics often deals with classical models where the dynamical variables are a collection of functions 
{φα}α over a d-dimensional space/spacetime manifold M where α is the "flavor" index. This involves functionals over the φs, functional derivatives, functional integrals, etc. From a functional point of view this is equivalent to working with an infinite-dimensional smooth manifold where its points are an assignment of a function for each α, and the procedure is in analogy with differential geometry where the coordinates for a point x of the manifold M are φα(x).

In the DeWitt notation''' (named after theoretical physicist Bryce DeWitt), φα(x) is written as φi where i is now understood as an index covering both α and x.

So, given a smooth functional A, A,i stands for the functional derivative

as a functional of φ''. In other words, a "1-form" field over the infinite dimensional "functional manifold".

In integrals, the Einstein summation convention is used. Alternatively,

References
 

Quantum field theory
Mathematical notation